A Liar Wrote This is the sixth studio album by post-hardcore band The Bunny the Bear, released through Victory Records on July 24, 2015. It is the band's first release without founding clean vocalist Chris Hutka, and the first and only release to feature Haley Roback. The album's title is derived from Tybor's side project, "A Liar Wrote This Symphony."

The album was recorded in early 2015 shortly after the departure of Chris Hutka. The album was announced in June 2015, with an accompanying single, "Lover's Touch." A re-recorded version of "It's Not Always Cold in Buffalo" (originally on Stories) was included on the album and released with an accompanying music video.

Three of the album's tracks: Curtain Call, Somewhat Standards, and Sleep Sequence, were originally recorded by A Liar Wrote This Symphony in 2012.

Track listing

Personnel

The Bunny the Bear
Haley "The Bear" Roback - clean vocals
Matthew "The Bunny" Tybor - unclean vocals, additional clean vocals, songwriting, lyrics, producing, bass

Additional personnel
Doug White - guitars, producing, engineering
Matthew McGinley - drums, percussion, additional production
Joe Mosey - guitar on "Love, Trust, and Compromise"
Jacob Boyce - additional guitar on "Curtain Call"
Steve Drachenberg - bass on "Sick, Sad Eyes"
Nate Blasdell - guitar on "Sick, Sad Eyes"
Brandy Wynn - violin
Val Hill - drums on "Loose Lips"
Ali Lander-Shindler - album artwork and layout

References

2015 albums
The Bunny the Bear albums
Victory Records albums